Zaur Pashayev (born August 28, 1982) is an Azerbaijani judoka.

Achievements

References

1982 births
Living people
Azerbaijani male judoka
Place of birth missing (living people)
21st-century Azerbaijani people